Göran Öhlund (born 13 December 1942) is a Swedish orienteering competitor. He is two times Relay World Champion as a member of the Swedish winning teams in 1966 and 1968.

References

1942 births
Living people
Swedish orienteers
Male orienteers
Foot orienteers
World Orienteering Championships medalists